Unseeded Carling Bassett won in the final of the singles event at the 1983 Virginia Slims of Pennsylvania 2–6, 6–0, 6–4 against Sandy Collins.

Seeds
A champion seed is indicated in bold text while text in italics indicates the round in which that seed was eliminated.

  Susan Mascarin (second round)
  Alycia Moulton (first round)
  Kate Latham (first round)
  Lucia Romanov (first round)
  Dana Gilbert (first round)
  Patricia Medrado (first round)
  Anne White (semifinals)
  Peanut Louie (quarterfinals)

Draw

References
 1983 Virginia Slims of Pennsylvania Draw

Virginia Slims of Pennsylvania
1983 Virginia Slims World Championship Series